The Marsh Biography Award was a British literary award, given to the author of the best biography written in the previous two years by a British author. It was established in 1987 and was presented biennially until 2011. The Marsh Christian Trust and the English Speaking Union presented this award in partnership.

Winners
 1987 - Roland Huntford - Shackleton
 1989 - David Gilmour - The Last Leopard
 1991 - Hugh & Mirabel Cecil - Clever Hearts
 1993 - Patrick Marnham - The Man who Wasn't Maigret
 1995 - Selina Hastings - Evelyn Waugh
 1997 - Jim Ring - Erskine Childers
 1999 - Richard Holmes - Coleridge: Darker Reflections
 2001 - Anthony Sampson - Mandela: The Authorised Biography
 2003 - Brenda Maddox - Rosalind Franklin: The Dark Lady of DNA
 2005 - John Guy - My Heart is My Own
 2007 - Maggie Ferguson - George Mackay Brown: The Life
 2009 - Rosemary Hill - God’s Architect: Pugin and the Building of Romantic Britain
 2011 - D.R. Thorpe - Supermac: The Life of Harold Macmillan

References

British literary awards
Biography awards
Awards established in 1987
1987 establishments in the United Kingdom